11 Compositions (Duo) 1995 is an album by composer and saxophonist Anthony Braxton with kotoist Brett Larner, recorded at Wesleyan University in 1995 and released on the Leo label.

Reception

The Allmusic review by  Steve Loewy stated:

Track listing
All compositions by Anthony Braxton.
 "Composition 65" – 4:57
 "Composition 74B" – 8:12
 "Composition 72H" – 2:46
 "Composition 74E" – 8:11
 "Composition 72A (Take 2)" – 3:51
 "Composition 72F" – 6:07
 "Composition 74D" – 15:17
 "Composition 74A" – 5:27
 "Composition 72C" – 4:18
 "Composition 87" – 15:31
 "Composition 72A (Take 1)" – 3:42

Personnel
 Anthony Braxton – flute, clarinet, contralto clarinet, contrabass clarinet soprano clarinet, sopranino saxophone, alto saxophone, F saxophone
Brett Larner – 13-string koto, 17-string bass koto

References

Anthony Braxton live albums
1997 live albums
Leo Records live albums